The Shensi tree frog (Hyla tsinlingensis) is a species of frog in the family Hylidae endemic to China. Its natural habitats are temperate shrubland, rivers, intermittent rivers, swamps, freshwater marshes, intermittent freshwater marshes, and irrigated land.
It is threatened by habitat loss.

References

Hyla
Amphibians described in 1966
Taxonomy articles created by Polbot